"This machine kills fascists" is a message that Woody Guthrie placed on his guitar in the mid 1940s, starting in 1943.

Conception
Circa 1943, in the midst of World War II, Guthrie wrote the war song "Talking Hitler's Head Off Blues". This was printed in the Daily Worker, a newspaper published by the Communist Party USA. Then, according to biographer Anne E. Neimark, "In a fit of patriotism and faith in the impact of the song, he painted on his guitar THIS MACHINE KILLS FASCISTS."

Guthrie's stance against fascism
In Guthrie's opposition to fascism, he conceptualized the ideology "as a form of economic exploitation similar to slavery", straightforwardly denouncing the fascists – particularly their leaders – as a group of gangsters who set out to "rob the world". This recalled a protest strategy he had used "during the Great Depression, when social, political, and economic inequality had been engendered by a small rich elite". During that era, Guthrie had "romanticized the deeds of outlaws such as Jesse James, Pretty Boy Floyd, Calamity Jane or the Dalton Gang both as legitimate acts of social responsibility and as 'the ultimate expression of protest', thus transforming the outlaw into an archetypal partisan in a fight against those who were held responsible for the worsening social and economic conditions". 

In this, Guthrie cast those opposing fascism not as mere outlaws in a fascist state, but as heroes rising "in times of economic turmoil and social disintegration" to fight "a highly illegitimate criminal endeavor intended to exploit the common people". Guthrie portrayed these characters as something larger than merely "dumb gangsters", while his lyricism also "externalized the inhuman element of fascism by describing its representatives as animals that were usually held in very low esteem and were associated with a range of bad character traits". For example, he talked about the "Nazi Snake" that has to be countered in his song "Talking Hitler's Head Off Blues". Guthrie would declare "[a]nything human is anti Hitler" and in his song "You Better Get Ready" he has the figure of Satan declare that "Old Hell just ain't the same/Compared to Hitler, hell, I'm tame!" Guthrie saw the battle against fascism as the ultimate battle of good versus evil. In a letter to "Railroad Pete" he stated "fascism and freedom are the only two sides battling ... [this was the war] the world has been waiting on for twenty five million years ... [which would] settle the score once and for all".

Legacy

The message has inspired subsequent artists.
 Author John Green of vlogbrothers added a sticker with the message onto his laptop for the series Crash Course, which drew criticism from New Hampshire State Representative Richard Littlefield. The phrase, in the context of Guthrie, was also featured in Green's novel Paper Towns and the movie of the same name.
 Guitarist Tom Morello of Rage Against The Machine was inspired by Guthrie to put a slogan on every guitar he owns like "Arm The Homeless," "Soul Power," "Sendero Luminoso," and many more.
 New York City street performer Colin Huggins inscribed the message on his Steinway grand piano.
 Donovan put the message "This machine kills" on his guitar, leaving off the word "fascists"; he explained in his autobiography, "I dropped the last word, thinking fascism was already dead."
 The Dropkick Murphys' 11th studio album is titled This Machine Still Kills Fascists.
 Pittsburgh-based Punk band Anti-Flag's 2001 album Underground Network includes a song entitled "This Machine Kills Fascists"
 Musician Julien Baker had a sticker reading “This Machine Kills Sadness” on her acoustic guitar in reference to Guthrie, although she later removed it. She further references him in a tattoo and in the song “Guthrie” from the EP B-Sides

See also
 List of guitars

References

English phrases
Woody Guthrie
Anti-fascist works
Individual guitars
Stickers
Slogans
Anti-fascist music
1940s neologisms
1940s in American music